

Vollrath von Hellermann (18 May 1900 – 25 August 1971) was a general n the Wehrmacht during World War II.  He was also a recipient of the Knight's Cross of the Iron Cross.

Awards and decorations

 German Cross in Gold on 20 September 1942 as Oberstleutnant in Kradschützen-Abteilung 4
 Knight's Cross of the Iron Cross on 21 November 1942 as Oberstleutnant and commander of Panzergrenadier-Regiment 21

References

Citations

Bibliography

 

1900 births
1971 deaths
People from Ratzeburg
People from the Province of Schleswig-Holstein
Major generals of the German Army (Wehrmacht)
Recipients of the Gold German Cross
Recipients of the Knight's Cross of the Iron Cross
German prisoners of war in World War II
Military personnel from Schleswig-Holstein
German Army generals of World War II